= Lance Mountain (Georgia) =

Mountain in Georgia, United States

Coordinates: 34.938°N 84.158°W

Lance Mountain is a summit in the U.S. state of Georgia. The elevation is 2,280 feet (690 m).

Lance Mountain has the name of Thomas Lance, a pioneer settler.
